The Brain is a 1988 Canadian science fiction horror film depicting a giant brain-like alien that terrorizes. The film has developed a small cult following.

Plot
Dr. Blakely runs a TV show called Independent Thinkers, which is a Scientology-like self-help/religion program. But he is not making his audience think any more independently - with the help of an alien organism he calls The Brain, he is using brainwashing and mind control. The only thing that stands between them and world domination is a brilliant but troubled high school student with a penchant for pranks.

Cast
David Gale as Dr. Anthony Blakely
Tom Bresnahan as Jim Majelewski
Cynthia Preston as Janet
George Buza as Varna 
Brett Pearson as Willie
Sarah Chapple as Debbie Hodges
Christine Kossak as Vivian

Release
The Brain was shown in Toronto, Canada on November 4, 1988.

Reception
From contemporary reviews, "Devo." of Variety reviewed the film on November 3, 1988. "Devo." stated the film was a "cliche-ridden effort, with little comic or ironic relief to put a spin on it sci-fi banalities." The reviewer went on to declare that the film's "ambition to comment on the power of tv and gullibility of its viewers vanishes quickly."

See also
 Journey to the Seventh Planet
 The Guests (The Outer Limits)

References

Sources

External links

 
 

1988 horror films
1988 films
English-language Canadian films
Fictional amorphous creatures
Films scored by Paul Zaza
Giant monster films
1980s science fiction horror films
Alien invasions in films
Canadian science fiction horror films
1980s exploitation films
1980s English-language films
1980s Canadian films